= Luis Alejandro Capdevielle Flores =

Mexican editor and politician

Diputado Federal de la Chamber of Deputies of Mexico
- In office December 6, 2012 – August 15, 2015

Diputado Federal Suplente de la Chamber of Deputies of Mexico
- In office December 6, 2012 – August 15, 2015

Presidente Asociación de Editores de Periódicos, Diarios y Revistas de la República Mexicana
- In office 7 March 2003 – 9 March 2007

Personal details
- Born: March 13, 1953 (age 73) Hermosillo, Sonora
- Party: PRI
- Education: Universidad Nacional Autónoma de México
- Occupation: Lawyer, editor, politician
- Website: http://alejandrocapdevielleflores.com

Luis Alejandro Capdevielle Flores (born March 13, 1953) is a Mexican lawyer, editor and politician. He is a member of the Institutional Revolutionary Party (PRI). He serves as deputy to the state of Sonora in the LXII Legislature. He began the deputy charge after Manlio Fabio Beltrones assumed his position as national PRI leader. As businessman and editor, he directed the newspapers El Cambio de Sonora, El Sol de Hermosillo and others.

== Early life ==
Luis Alejandro Capdevielle Flores was born in Hermosillo. He grew up in Hermosillo city with his parents; Alejandro Capdevielle, editor and journalist, and Laura Fluoresces, accountant. He graduated from law school at the Autonomous University of Mexico (UNAM).

== Career ==
He was part of the Association of Editors of Newspapers, Diaries and Magazines of Mexico (AEDIRMEX). In 1999 he became vice president of the Association and in 2003, he served as AEDIRMEX president for 4 years.

Capdevielle took charge of the Management Council of the newspaper Diario La Expresión when it was bought in 1994 it was refounded as a new brand: El Cambio Sonora. Different subproducts were developed over a decade; Palabra Abierta (1997), Nogales (1999), Revista Dominical (2000) and Deportes: Béisbol" (2002). In 2006 the Newspaper was sold to the Organización Editorial Mexicana after several "attempts against criticism and informing liberty".

In 2006 he served as the substitute of Jesus Alberto Cano Velez in the Alianza por México. In 2009 and 2012 he contended for the federal deputy of District IX against Miguel Hidalgo. During this period, Capdevielle worked with President Vicente Fox to guarantee the professional secrecy of journalists and to maintain a zero tax policy that exempted newspapers from Mexico's VAT. In 2006, with other presidents of Associations and Attorneys, he signed the agreement to protect journalists' fundamental rights.

Capdevielle served as adviser of the Managerial Council of the CIRT and Juridical Adviser of diverse editors of newspapers and magazines, journalistic columns and foreign correspondents.
